Daniel Roberts (born 27 January 1966), also credited as Danny Roberts, is an Australian actor. He is perhaps best known his roles as Ailsa Stewart's younger creepy brother Tony O'Rourke in early January 1997, Dennis Harling from September 2011 until February 2012, and Gavin Cooper from 12 to 24 November 2015 in Home and Away.

Early life
Roberts was born in Perth, Western Australia on 27 January 1966.

Acting career
He started with the Patch Theatre at age 12, and was in the first round at Western Australian Academy of Performing Arts in 1979. He moved to Melbourne in 1982 where he appeared in Cop Shop and The Sullivans. He then played a lead role in the soap opera Waterloo Station (1983), but the series was cancelled after a few months on air. He then became a major cast member in Sons and Daughters, playing Andy Green from 1983 until the series ended in 1987.

Roberts went on to a regular role in soap opera The Power, The Passion which ran for eight months in 1989. After the series was cancelled he moved to Byron Bay, New South Wales, where he founded the Australian Theatre Company in 1991. He was artistic director of the company until 1995, then acted in the series Fire, playing Georgie Parker's brother Ted Cartright. Other roles include The Last Bullet, Home and Away, Blue Heelers, Murder Call, Stingers, Young Lions, Big Sky, and Close Contact. His film credits include Blackwater Trail, Walking on Water, Beneath Clouds, Mission: Impossible 2, and Dreamland. He worked on Underbelly: The Golden Mile. He played Nate's father Gavin Cooper on Home and Away in 2015.

Personal life 
After Sons and Daughters, Roberts travelled to the United States, where he met his future wife Lindsay Neil. They married in 1989. They had two children. His son David appeared in Home and Away from 2008 until 2013.

External links 
 
 Dreamland

Notes

1966 births
20th-century Australian male actors
21st-century Australian male actors
Australian expatriate male actors in the United States
Australian male film actors
Australian male soap opera actors
Australian male television actors
Australian people of Welsh descent
Living people
Male actors from Perth, Western Australia
Western Australian Academy of Performing Arts alumni